DVD R may refer to:
DVD+R
DVD-R

See also
DVD-RAM
DVD recordable